Mine-aux-Pipistrelles Ecological Reserve is an ecological reserve in Quebec, Canada. It was established on  It is the first ecological reserve in an underground environment. The reserve contains 5 species of bats that hibernate in Quebec: Myotis lucifugus, Eptesicus fuscus, Myotis septentrionalis, Myotis leibii and Pipistrellus subflavus.

References

External links
 Official website from Government of Québec

Protected areas of Estrie
Nature reserves in Quebec
Protected areas established in 2002
2002 establishments in Quebec
Bats of Canada